The 2003 United Kingdom Budget, officially known as Opportunity for all: The strength to take the long-term decisions for Britain was the formal government budget for the year 2003.

Details

Tax Revenue

Spending

References 

Budget
United Kingdom budgets
United Kingdom budget
Gordon Brown